Rochester Museum may refer to the following:

Rochester Museum and Science Center (founded 1912), in Rochester, New York 
Rochester Museum of Fine Arts (founded 2011), in Rochester, New Hampshire

See also
Rochester & Genesee Valley Railroad Museum in Industry, New York
:Category:Museums in Rochester, New York